Katherine Obiang is a Cameroonian-Nigerian actress, on-air personality and TV presenter. Initially, she worked as a television presenter for Nigerian Television Authority (NTA) on AM Express and also with Nigeria Info 99.3FM. She subsequently started acting and starred in Nollywood movies and TV series. She featured in the 2017 movie, The Women and won the 2017 Best of Nollywood Awards for the Best Supporting Actress alongside Kate Henshaw and Omoni Oboli.

She has featured alongside other actors in  movies such as Lekki Wives, We Don't Live Here Anymore, and Journey to Self amongst others.

Biography 
Katherine Obiang was married to Who Wants to be a Millionaire (Nigerian game show) host Frank Edoho. The duo was married for 7 years and had three children. They separated in 2011 and the marriage ended in 2013.

Career

Obiang is an actress, entertainer, on-air personality, and TV presenter. She worked as a  TV presenter for Nigerian Television Authority (NTA) on AM Express (morning show) and Nigerian Info 99.3FM. She became more prominent when she featured in the 2012 movie, Journey to Self, directed by Tope Oshin. Afterwards, she has appeared in several Nollywood movies and TV series.

Filmography

 The Women (2017)
We Don't Live Here Anymore (2018)
Lekki Wives (2012)
Journey to Self (2012) 
Love and War (2013)
Heaven's Hell (2019)

Accolades

References

External links

Living people
Nigerian television presenters
Nigerian television actresses
Nigerian television personalities
21st-century Nigerian actresses
Nigerian women television presenters
Year of birth missing (living people)